Baño de damas is a 2003 Peruvian-Venezuelan romantic comedy film directed by Michel Katz and written by Katz & Ricardo Moura. Starring Lorena Meritano, Viviana Gibelli, Eduardo Santamarina and Andrea Montenegro. It is based on the play of the same name.

Synopsis 
The incidents that occur on the dance floor and in the ladies' bathroom of a fashionable tropical nightclub will change the life of a macho congressman, a naive and subjugated wife, a not very faithful lesbian couple, a transvestite who dreams of changing sex and a dapper schoolteacher who loses her temper over drink.

Cast 
The actors participating in this film are:

 Lorena Meritano as Dilka
 Viviana Gibelli as Cloe Castro
 Eduardo Santamarina as Carmelo López
 Andrea Montenegro as María Inés
 Karina Calmet as Valeria
 Coco Marusix as "Gaviota"
 Elena Romero as Aurora
 Sonia Oquendo as Fabiana
 Bettina Oneto as Antonia
 Paula Marijuan as Lorena
 Mariel Ocampo as Amanda
 Rebeca Escribens as Nora
 Jesús Delaveaux as Fernando
 Giovanna Azaldegui

Reception 
The film attracted 169,244 viewers in its entire run in Peruvian theaters.

References

External links 

 

2003 films
2003 romantic comedy films
2003 LGBT-related films
Peruvian romantic comedy films
Peruvian LGBT-related films
Venezuelan romantic comedy films
Venezuelan LGBT-related films
2000s Spanish-language films
2000s Peruvian films

Lesbian-related films
Films about trans women
Films about infidelity
Films based on plays